Liaocheng Sports Park Stadium is a multi-purpose stadium in Liaocheng, China. It is used mostly for football matches and it opened in 2013.

Football venues in China
Multi-purpose stadiums in China